Augustino Jadalla Wani has been the Governor of Jubek State, South Sudan since 24 December 2015. He is the first governor of the state, which was created by President Salva Kiir on 2 October 2015. He previously served as the Deputy Minister of Interior and Wildlife Conservation.
He's a devout family man with a passion for education, indeed this has been seen in his educational projects in jubek state. Closer home he currently has children around the world pursuing diverse studies some in cities like Tel Aviv, Nairobi, Toronto, Kampala among other world renowned universities

References

Living people
South Sudanese politicians
Year of birth missing (living people)